Tilda Swinton is a British actress known for her performances on film and television. She received an Academy Award for Best Supporting Actress for her performance in the film Michael Clayton (2007).

Her early films include Sally Potter's Orlando (1992), Cameron Crowe's Vanilla Sky (2001), and Spike Jonze's Adaptation (2002). She also starred as the White Witch in the film adaptations of C.S. Lewis' The Chronicles of Narnia: The Lion, the Witch and the Wardrobe (2005), The Chronicles of Narnia: Prince Caspian (2008) and The Chronicles of Narnia: The Voyage of the Dawn Treader (2010). She also starred in David Fincher's The Curious Case of Benjamin Button (2008), Lynne Ramsay's We Need to Talk About Kevin (2011), and Jim Jarmusch's Only Lovers Left Alive (2013). She also appeared in the Marvel films Doctor Strange (2016), and Avengers: Endgame (2019). She is also known for her appearances in the Wes Anderson films Moonrise Kingdom (2012), The Grand Budapest Hotel (2014), Isle of Dogs (2018), and The French Dispatch (2021).

Film

Television

Video games

Music videos

References

External links
 
 BFI: Tilda Swinton
 Tilda Swinton Online - All things Tilda
 Tilda Swinton: A Life in Pictures, BAFTA webcast, 27 November 2007

Actress filmographies
Scottish filmographies